Humlebæk Church (Danish: Humlebæk Kirke) is a parish church in Humlebæk, Fredensborg Municipality, som 20 km north of central Copenhagen, Denmark.

History
Humlebæk was originally located in the vast Asminderød Parish. A chaplain conducted outdoor services for the residents of Humlebæk and Sletten in Lave Skov and at Sletten School. A group of residents from Asminderød, Grønholt and Fredensborg starting working for a new church in Humlebæk in 1866. Ballet master August Bournonville was a member of the committee and chamberlain C. Brun from Krogerup provided a piece of land and also contributed financially to the project. The architect Frederik Vilhelm Tvede was charged with the design of the new church. The foundation stone was set on 13 June 1868 in the presence of Christian IX and the completed church was already inaugurated on 20 December the same year. The church was initially referred to as "Capellet" (The Chapel).

The church was on the night between 18 and 18 December 1898 hit by fire. The fire was put out by local fishermen and people from Krogerup. It was badly damaged but reopened on 22 October 1899.

Architecture
The church is built in red brick in Byzantine style. The nave and chancel have barrel vaulted ceilings.

Furnishings
The altar was created by E. Zeuthen Nielsen in 1868. A glass mosaic by Sven Havsteen Mikkelsen representing the battle of light against darkness is located behind the altar. The old altarpiece, an 1868 painting by A. Dorph depicting Christ on the cross, is now located to the north of the altar.

The baptismal font was created in 1846 by H. Dalhoff for the Church of the Holy Ghost in Copenhagen. It was donated to Humlebæk Church in 1895. The votive ship, a 12-gun naval brig, was donated to the church by fisherman and diver Jens Jensen in connection with its inauguration in 1868. The current organ was built by Carsten Lund in 1997.

Churchyard
Notable burials in the surrounding churchyard include:
 Charles Brun (1866–1919), politician
 Eske Brun (1904–1987), civil servant n
 Fritz Brun (1813–1888), politician and landowner
 Ebba Carstensen (1885–1967), painter
 Urban Gad (1879–1947), filmmaker
 Viggo Jarl (1879–1965), sculptor
 Knud W. Jensen (1916–2000), businessman and museum founder
 Ole Kielberg (1911–1985),, painter
 Knud Kristensen (1880–1962), politician
 Erik Moltke (1901–1983), writer and runologist
 Elna Møller (1912–1994), architect and editor
 Jens Rosing (1925–2008), illustrator and author 
 Kristian Vedel (1923–2003), designer
 Peter Zobel (1936–2017),  businessman

Further reading
 Jensen, Tage: Humlebæk Kirkes historie

References

External links

Churches in Fredensborg Municipality
Churches in the Diocese of Helsingør